Gangte is a Sino-Tibetan language of Kuki-Chin linguistic sub branch of Northeastern India. Its speakers primarily live in Manipur and the adjacent areas of Meghalaya and Assam. The language appears to be homogeneous with no known dialectal variation and exhibits at least partial mutual intelligibility with the other Chin-Kuki-Mizo dialects of the area including Thadou, Hmar, Vaiphei, Simte, Kom and Paite languages. There are a few speakers across the border in Burma.

Geographical distribution
Gangte is spoken in 37 villages of southern Churachandpur district, Manipur (Ethnologue). It is also spoken in Meghalaya and Assam.

References

Kuki-Chin languages
Languages of Assam
Languages of Manipur
Languages of Meghalaya
Endangered languages of India